Lawrence D. "Larry" Cohen (April 17, 1933 – September 11, 2016) was an American attorney, politician, and judge who served as mayor of Saint Paul, Minnesota from 1972 to 1976.

Early life and education 
Born in Saint Paul, Minnesota, Cohen graduated from the University of Minnesota Law School in 1957.

Career 
After graduating from law school, Cohen entered private practice as an attorney at law in Minnesota. He was elected to the Ramsey County, Minnesota Board of Commissioners in 1970 serving two years before being elected mayor of Saint Paul. Succeeded by George Latimer as mayor, Cohen returned to the private practice of law until appointed as a Minnesota state judge by Governor Rudy Perpich in 1988. Judge Cohen retired in 2002. He died on September 11, 2016 of cancer in Saint Paul, Minnesota.

References

Senior Judge Lawrence D. Cohen Minnesota Judicial Branch

1933 births
2016 deaths
Minnesota state court judges
County commissioners in Minnesota
Mayors of Saint Paul, Minnesota
Minnesota Democrats
University of Minnesota Law School alumni
Minnesota lawyers
20th-century American judges
20th-century American lawyers